The 1988–89 Serie A was won by Internazionale, who won the title comfortably by an 11-point margin over runners-up Napoli. Milan's triumph in the European Cup meant Italy would be entering two teams – both the two giant Milan sides – into the European Cup for the 1989–90 season. Relegated to Serie B were Torino, Pescara, Pisa and Como.

Teams
Bologna, Lecce, Lazio and Atalanta had been promoted from Serie B.

Events
Following the expansion of the league, a fourth relegation was added.

Final classification

Results

UEFA Cup qualification

Fiorentina qualified for 1989–90 UEFA Cup.

Top goalscorers

  Capocannonieri

References and sources

Almanacco Illustrato del Calcio - La Storia 1898-2004, Panini Edizioni,

External links

 :it:Classifica calcio Serie A italiana 1989 - Italian version with pictures and info.
  - All results on RSSSF Website.

Serie A seasons
Italy
1988–89 in Italian football leagues